Luis Carlos Vélez (October 6, 1977 in Bogotá, Colombia) is a multiplatform journalist / news executive. Velez anchors Linea de Fuego, Univision Noticias 24/7, daily political show and is La FM 's news director and anchor of "La FM con Luis Carlos Velez"  Monday to Friday from 5 - 10 am. He also writes an Opinion column for http://www.semana.com

20+ yrs of experience in Network News, Cable News, Radio, and Digital. Founder and Board Member of Mi Megafono, a leading digital platform for advertising in media in Colombia and Panamá.

Former Executive Vice President of News at Telemundo Network , News Director and Anchor at Caracol TV Colombia and Anchor/reporter at CNN International and CNN en Español.

Velez holds an MPA from Harvard University and is an expert on Economics and Finance.

Early life
Colombian / American born in Bogotá. Vélez is an MPA from the Harvard Kennedy School of Government and an Economist from Universidad de los Andes. He also earned undergraduate credits at the London School of Economics and holds a Certificate in Administration and Management from Harvard University Extension School in Massachusetts. Vélez speaks Spanish and English.

Career
Vélez started his professional career in finance working for Enron Corporation in Texas. After the company's debacle moved to journalism career as International Editor at Caracol Noticias.  

From 2005 to 2012, Vélez worked at CNN. First as CNN en Español´s Business Programing Supervisor, being responsible of Economia y Finanzas, En Efectivo and Agenda Ejecutiva, and later as Anchor/Reporter for CNN International based in New York. 

From 2012 to 2015, Luis Carlos was Anchor and News Director in Caracol TV Colombia. In that role he supervised all editorial content for Noticias Caracol across its multimedia platforms and anchored Ultima Edición.

From 2015 to 2017, he worked at Telemundo Network as Executive Vice President of News at Telemundo Network and later as Anchor. As EVP, Velez was responsible of all editorial and production of the network's news division including multiple time Emmy Award winner productions: Un Nuevo Dia, Al Rojo Vivo and Noticiero Telemundo. 

Since 2018 Vélez is Anchor/News Director at La FM in Colombia.

Honors

In 2015, Vélez received an Emmy for best News Coverage in Spanish TV as Executive Producer.

Personal life

Luis Carlos is married with Siad Char and have two kids, Hannah and Simon.  

Based in Miami, FL

References

1977 births
Alumni of the London School of Economics
Colombian television presenters
Colombian television journalists
Living people
Harvard Extension School alumni
Harvard University alumni